The Geological Society of America (GSA) is a nonprofit organization dedicated to the advancement of the geosciences.

History 
The society was founded in Ithaca, New York, in 1888 by Alexander Winchell, John J. Stevenson, Charles H. Hitchcock, John R. Procter and Edward Orton and has been headquartered at 3300 Penrose Place, Boulder, Colorado, US, since 1967.

GSA began with 100 members under its first president, James Hall. In 1889 Mary Emilie Holmes became its first female member. It grew slowly but steadily to 600 members until 1931, when a nearly $4 million endowment from 1930 president R. A. F. Penrose Jr. jumpstarted GSA's growth. As of December 2017, GSA had more than 25,000 members in over 100 countries.

The society has six regional sections in North America, three interdisciplinary interest groups, and eighteen specialty divisions.

Activities
The stated mission of GSA is "to advance geoscience research and discovery, service to society, stewardship of Earth, and the geosciences profession". Its main activities are sponsoring scientific meetings and publishing scientific literature, particularly the peer-reviewed journals Geological Society of America Bulletin, published continuously since 1889, and Geology, published since 1973. In 2005, GSA introduced its online-only journal Geosphere, and in February 2009, GSA began publishing Lithosphere (both also peer-reviewed). Geosphere and Lithosphere are open access as of 2018. GSA's monthly news and science magazine, GSA Today, is also open access online. GSA also publishes three book series: Special Papers, Memoirs, and Field Guides. A third major activity is awarding research grants to graduate students.

Position statements
GSA issues Position Statements "in support of and consistent with the GSA's Vision and Mission to develop consensus on significant professional, technical, and societal issues of relevance to the geosciences community. Position Statements, developed and adopted through a well-defined process, provide the basis for statements made on behalf of the GSA before government bodies and agencies and communicated to the media and the general public."

For example, in 2006, the GSA adopted a Position Statement on Global Climate Change:
The Geological Society of America (GSA) supports the scientific conclusions that Earth’s climate is changing; the climate changes are due in part to human activities; and the probable consequences of the climate changes will be significant and blind to geopolitical boundaries. Furthermore, the potential implications of global climate change and the time scale over which such changes will likely occur require active, effective, long-term planning.
Current predictions of the consequences of global climate change include: (1) rising sea level, (2) significant alteration of global and regional climatic patterns with an impact on water availability, (3) fundamental changes in global temperature distribution, (4) melting of polar ice, and (5) major changes in the distribution of plant and animal species. While the precise magnitude and rate of climate change cannot be predicted with absolute certainty, significant change will affect the planet and stress its inhabitants.

Past presidents
Past presidents of the Geological Society of America:

James Hall, 1889
James Dwight Dana, 1890
Alexander Winchell, 1891
Grove Karl "G.K." Gilbert, 1892
J. William Dawson, 1893
Thomas C. Chamberlin, 1894
Nathanial S. Shaler, 1895
Joseph Le Conte, 1896
Edward Orton, Sr., 1897
J.J. Stevenson, 1898
Benjamin K. Emerson, 1899
George Mercer Dawson, 1900
Charles D. Walcott, 1901
N.H. Winchell, 1902
Samuel F. Emmons, 1903
John Casper Branner, 1904
Raphael Pumpelly, 1905
Israel Cook Russell, 1906
C.R. Van Hise, 1907
Samuel Calvin, 1908
G.K. Gilbert (2nd term), 1909
Arnold Hague, 1910
William M. Davis, 1911
H.L. Fairchild, 1912
Eugene A. Smith, 1913
George F. Becker, 1914
Arthur P. Coleman, 1915
John M. Clarke, 1916
Frank D. Adams, 1917
Whitman Cross, 1918
J.C. Merriam, 1919
Israel C. White, 1920
James F. Kemp, 1921
Charles Schuchert, 1922
David White, 1923
Waldemar Lindgren, 1924
William B. Scott, 1925
Andrew Cowper Lawson, 1926
Arthur Keith, 1927
Bailey Willis, 1928
Heinrich Ries, 1929

R.A.F. Penrose Jr., 1930
Alfred C. Lane, 1931
Reginald Aldworth Daly, 1932
C.K. Leith, 1933
W.H. Collins, 1934
Nevin M. Fenneman, 1935
W.C. Mendenhall, 1936
Charles Palache, 1937
Arthur Louis Day, 1938
T. Wayland Vaughan, 1939
Eliot Blackwelder, 1940
Charles P. Berkey, 1941
Douglas W. Johnson, 1942
E.L. Bruce, 1943
Adolph Knopf, 1944
Edward W. Berry, 1945
Norman L. Bowen, 1946
A.I. Levorsen, 1947
James Gilluly, 1948
Chester Ray Longwell, 1949
William Walden Rubey, 1950
Chester Stock, 1951
Thomas S. Lovering, 1952
Wendell P. Woodring, 1953
Ernst Cloos, 1954
Walter H. Bucher, 1955
George S. Hume, 1956
Richard J. Russell, 1957
Raymond Cecil Moore, 1958
Marland P. Billings, 1959
Hollis Dow Hedberg, 1960
Thomas B. Nolan, 1961
M. King Hubbert 1962
Harry H. Hess 1963
Francis Birch 1964
Wilmot H. Bradley 1965
Robert Ferguson Legget 1966
Konrad B. Krauskopf 1967
Ian Campbell, 1968
Morgan J. Davis, 1969
John Rodgers, 1970

Richard H. Jahns, 1971
Luna Leopold, 1972
John C. Maxwell, 1973
Clarence R. Allen, 1974
Julian R. Goldsmith, 1975
Robert E. Folinsbee, 1976
Charles L. Drake, 1977
Peter T. Flawn, 1978
Leon T. Silver, 1979
Laurence L. Sloss, 1980
Howard R. Gould, 1981
Digby J. McLaren, 1982
Paul A. Bailly, 1983
M. Gordon Wolman, 1984
Brian J. Skinner, 1985
W. Gary Ernst, 1986
Jack E. Oliver, 1987
Albert W. Bally, 1988
Randolph Bromery, 1989
Raymond A. Price, 1990
Doris Malkin Curtis, 1991
E-An Zen, 1992
Robert D. Hatcher, 1993
William R. Dickinson, 1994
David A. Stephenson, 1995
Eldridge M. Moores, 1996
George A. Thompson, 1997
Victor R. Baker, 1998
Gail M. Ashley, 1999
Mary Lou Zoback, 2000
Sharon Mosher, 2001
Anthony J. Naldrett, 2002
B. Clark Burchfiel, 2003
Rob Van der Voo, 2004
William A. Thomas, 2005
Stephen G. Wells, 2006
John M. "Jack" Sharp, Jr., 2007
Judith Totman Parrish, 2008
Jean M. Bahr, 2009
Joaquin Ruiz, 2010
John Geissman, 2011

George H. Davis, 2012
Suzanne Mahlburg Kay, 2013
Harry "Hap" McSween, 2014
Jonathan G. Price, 2015
Claudia I. Mora, 2016
Isabel P. Montañez, 2017
Robbie Gries, 2018
Donald I. Siegel, 2019
J. Douglas Walker, 2020
Barbara Dutrow, 2021

See also

Penrose Medal
Arthur L. Day Medal
Meinzer Award
Kirk Bryan Award
G K Gilbert Award
Florence Bascom
Mary C. Rabbitt
Doris M. Curtis Outstanding Woman in Science Award

References

External links
GSA Official Website

 
Learned societies of the United States
1888 establishments in New York (state)
America
Organizations established in 1888
Professional associations based in the United States
Non-profit organizations based in Colorado